The Bulletin for the History of Chemistry is a  peer-reviewed scientific journal that publishes articles on the history of chemistry. The journal is published by the History of Chemistry Division of the American Chemical Society.

History of Chemistry
Chemistry journals
History journals
Publications established in 1988
History of chemistry
English-language journals
Quarterly journals